The 1948 Oregon Webfoots football team represented the University of Oregon in the 1948 college football season. The Webfoots competed as a member of the Pacific Coast Conference (PCC). The team was led by head coach Jim Aiken, in his second year, and played their home games at Hayward Field in Eugene and at Multnomah Field in Portland. Oregon finished the regular season ranked ninth, with nine wins and one loss, and won all seven conference games in  They did not play Montana or #4 California; the Golden Bears won all ten games during the 

Schedule

Personnel
Notable players included quarterback Norm Van Brocklin, center Brad Ecklund, and halfback

References

 McCann, Michael C. (1995). Oregon Ducks Football: 100 Years of Glory. Eugene, Oregon: McCann Communications Corp. .

Oregon
Oregon Ducks football seasons
Pac-12 Conference football champion seasons
Oregon Webfoots football